The 2010–11 Hartford Hawks women's basketball team represented the University of Hartford during the 2010–11 NCAA Division I women's basketball season. Jennifer Rizzotti returned for her 12th season as head coach. With most of the previous season's roster returning, Hartford was poised to make a run in the America East Conference. Hartford struggled in its non-conference schedule going 3–10, including a season-opening loss to rival Central Connecticut. Hartford salvaged its season by winning the America East conference tournament and qualifying for the NCAA tournament for a second consecutive year.

Roster

Schedule

|-
!colspan=9 style=| Non-conference regular season

|-
!colspan=9 style=| America East regular season

|-
!colspan=9 style=| America East Women's Tournament

|-
!colspan=9 style=| NCAA Women's Tournament

References

Hartford Hawks women's basketball seasons
Hartford Hawks women's b
Hartford Hawks women's b